Kumar Boresa (born 25 August 1995) is an Indian cricketer. He made his first-class debut for Sebastianites Cricket and Athletic Club in Tier B of the 2019–20 Premier League Tournament in Sri Lanka on 31 January 2020.

References

External links
 

1995 births
Living people
Indian cricketers
Sebastianites Cricket and Athletic Club cricketers
Cricketers from Rajasthan